Spice and Wolf is a Japanese light novel series written by Isuna Hasekura with accompanying illustrations drawn by Jū Ayakura. The series follows a traveling merchant, Kraft Lawrence, who peddles various goods from town to town to make a living in a stylized historical setting with European influences. He meets a pagan wolf-deity girl named Holo who normally appears to be a fifteen-year-old girl, except for a wolf's tail and ears. Lawrence and Holo start traveling together, and as they travel, her wisdom helps increase his profits, but at the same time, her true nature draws unwanted attention from the church.

Originally, Hasekura entered the first novel in the series into ASCII Media Works' twelfth Dengeki Novel Prize in 2005 and the novel won the Silver Prize, placing third. Seventeen volumes were published between February 10, 2006 and July 10, 2011 under ASCII Media Works' Dengeki Bunko imprint. In 2016, an eighteenth book in the series was published, along with the start of a new spinoff series entitled Wolf on the Parchment, focusing on the characters Cole and Myuri. Yen Press licensed the light novels in September 2008 for distribution in English. The first volume was released in December 2009, and a new volume was released every six months, but in 2013 was changed to being released every four months. The tagline for the novels is "Merchant meats spicy wolf.", an example of Engrish. The author of the novels has commented that what "meats" in the tagline really means is kept a secret, alluding to a possible intentional misspelling of "meets".

Volume list

Spice and Wolf

Wolf and Parchment

Related books
Guidebook:  -  (December 10, 2008)
Picture Book:  -  (April 30, 2009)
Artbook:  -  (July 30, 2011)

Additional stories
, from Dengeki hp Official Pirate Book
, from Everything Spice and Wolf
, from Artbook

See also

List of Spice and Wolf chapters
List of Spice and Wolf episodes

References

External links
Spice and Wolf light novels at Yen Press

Spice and Wolf